Eudonia piroformis is a moth in the family Crambidae. It was described by Hans Georg Amsel in 1949. It is found in Iraq.

References

Moths described in 1949
Eudonia